The fourth season of the legal drama series Damages premiered on the Audience Network, an entertainment channel owned by DirecTV, on July 13, 2011 and concluded on September 14, 2011. The season featured 10 episodes, bringing the series total to 49. The fourth season was released on DVD in region 1 on June 26, 2012.

The fourth season takes place three years after the Tobin case. Ellen has moved on with her life. Now an attorney working for another NYC firm, she's content with her cases and colleagues. Deep down, however, she wants a bigger challenge. When she discovers an old high-school boyfriend has been through a traumatic experience while working for High Star, a private security firm hired by the U.S. government to carry out special missions in Afghanistan, she suspects foul play and asks Patty for help. Patty knows that trying a case against High Star can make Ellen's career. Or ruin it. The plot was inspired by recent events and controversies surrounding Blackwater Security Consulting.

Cast and characters

Main cast 
 Glenn Close as Patty Hewes (10 episodes)
 Rose Byrne as Ellen Parsons (10 episodes)
 Dylan Baker as Jerry Boorman (10 episodes)
 John Goodman as Howard T. Erickson (10 episodes)

Recurring cast

Episodes

Production 
For its first three seasons, Damages aired on the FX Network, but the series' ratings continued to decline, with the third season finale, "The Next One's Gonna Go In Your Throat", managing to gain only a 0.2/0 ratings share amongst adults 18-49 and fewer than a million viewers. FX announced on April 4, 2010 that they would not be renewing Damages for a fourth season, though by that time rumors of the series being picked up by DirecTV had already begun to circulate. These rumors continued making the rounds until July 19, 2010 when DirecTV announced that it had officially picked up the series for a fourth and fifth season, each consisting of ten episodes. "We didn't say, 'Let's go rescue shows. We said, 'Let's go find quality programming that's going to resonate with our audience,'" said Derek Chang, an executive Vice President at DirecTV. "FX was very proud to have developed one of the best scripted series on television, but, in order to have a future, the show needed DirecTV and we are thrilled they stepped in," said John Landgraf, President and General Manager at FX.

As with previous seasons, season four is executive produced by creators Todd A. Kessler, Glenn Kessler and Daniel Zelman. Mark A. Baker serves as a co-executive producer, Lori Jo Nemhouser as producer and Mark Fish is a co-producer. Production began in New York City in January 2011.

Reception

Awards and nominations 
The season earned a Critics' Choice Television Award nomination for Dylan Baker as Best Guest Performer in a Drama Series, and a Screen Actors Guild nomination for Glenn Close for Outstanding Performance by a Female Actor in a Drama Series.

Critical reviews 
The fourth season of Damages was met with mostly high praise, and it earned 78 out of 100 based on 12 reviews on the aggregate review website Metacritic. This qualifies as "generally favorable reviews". On Rotten Tomatoes, the season has an approval rating of 100% with an average score of 8 out of 10 based on 11 reviews. The website's critical consensus reads, "Damages deftly negotiates its transition onto a new platform with a more compact season that further escalates the series' already considerable drama, this time aided by a boisterous John Goodman."

References

External links 
 

2011 American television seasons
season 4